Elizabeth Lippincott McQueen (January 1, 1878 – December 25, 1958) was the founder of the Women's International Association of Aeronautics.

Biography
She was born on New Year's Eve in 1878 in Salem County, New Jersey. Elizabeth's parents were the Reverend Dr. Benjamin Crispin Lippincott, who was the first superintendent of public instruction in Washington Territory, and New Jersey Methodist Episcopal Church minister; and Deborah Hand Diverty. Deborah was his second wife. Elizabeth had two brothers: Dr. Jesse R. Diverty Lippincott; a physician; and Reverend Benjamin Crispin Lippincott Jr.

Elizabeth married Ulysses Grant McQueen (1864-1937) in 1900.  He was a wealthy inventor and manufacturer in New York City. They lived in New York City until 1928, then moved to Beverly Hills, California.

During World War I, Mrs. McQueen left her home and served in war relief work in Palestine under Field Marshal Allenby.

In 1919, she founded the Jerusalem News, the first English-language newspaper in Jerusalem.

Interest in aviation
In 1920, she witnessed seven airplanes "take the place of two British regiments of soldiers" in routing a large number of rebel Arab cavalry in the desert near Aden. This ignited her interest in aviation.

In September 1928, she organized the Women's Aeronautic Association of California. Similar organizations were soon founded in New York, Arizona, New Mexico, Texas, Nevada, Oregon, Washington, Canada, England, France, Germany, Australia, and New Zealand. In May 1929, these various groups were merged into the Women's International Association of Aeronautics (WIAA), and this organization became the principal focus of her activities for the rest of her life.

She served as "founder and honorary president" of the WIAA; presidents of the association were, in turn, prominent British aviator Lady Mary Heath (1929-1932), British reporter Lady Grace Hay Drummond-Hay (1932-1940), educator Dr. Mary Sinclair Crawford (1940-1947), actress Mary Pickford (1947-1949), airplane manufacturing executive Olive Ann Beech (1949-1954), and pioneer aviator Matilde Moisant (1954-). There was even a junior division of the WIAA, formed in 1931; members under 7 years old were called "tailwinds", and those from 7 through 20 years old were called "zoomers".

In 1929, Mrs. McQueen and Lady Heath approached the Federation Aeronautique Internationale in Paris in order to have women's air records recognized. At the same time, in order to arouse greater interest in women's flying, Mrs. McQueen conceived the idea and was one of the principal organizers of the first Women's Air Derby from Santa Monica, California, to the 1929 National Air Races in Cleveland. (This event would become known as the "Powder Puff Derby".)

Later life
Ulysses Grant McQueen died in 1937, and about 1955 Mrs. McQueen married Dr. Irving Reed Bancroft, a prominent retired Los Angeles physician.

Death
She died at her home in Hermosa Beach, California, on December 24, 1958, at the age of 80, after a long period of declining health. She was cremated and her ashes were buried at the Portal of Folded Wings Shrine to Aviation.

Her archive is at the University of Southern California, Doheny Memorial Library in the Rare Books & Manuscripts room.

References

External links
Early Aviators: McQueen

1878 births
1958 deaths
Burials at Valhalla Memorial Park Cemetery
People from Salem County, New Jersey